The Aeolus Haoji (风神 皓极) is a compact crossover SUV produced by Dongfeng Motor Corporation under the Aeolus sub-brand. The Haoji compact crossover SUV is built on the DSMA platform developed by Dongfeng for conventional gasoline and PHEV models.

Overview
The Aeolus Haoji opened pre-sale on June 18, 2022 and was launched in August 2022. It is a compact crossover SUV positioned above the slightly smaller AX7 within the lineup of the Aeolus brand, while dimensions are slightly closer to traditional midsize crossover SUVs.

Powertrain
The Aeolus Haoji is offered with ICE and PHEV powertrains. The ICE version gets a 1.5-litre turbo engine developing 204 PS and 350 Nm, mated to a 7-speed DCT gearbox. The PHEV version gets the Dongfeng Mach MHD hybrid system with the same 1.5-litre turbo engine plus an electric motor (HD120) producing 245 PS and 540 Nm, mated to an E-CVT. This gives the Fengshen enough power for being a sporty and a family car at the same time.

Interior
The dashboard of the Aeolus Haoji has a 12.3-inch twin-screen setup with a screen for the infotainment system and a screen for the instrument panel with level 2 driver assistance system for safety. The screen can be controlled by touch or a rotary dial on the left side of the center tunnel. The gasoline version of the Haoji is equipped with the Jamo audio system.

References

External links

Aeolus Official Site

Aeolus Haoji
Compact sport utility vehicles
Crossover sport utility vehicles
Front-wheel-drive vehicles
Cars of China
2020s cars
Cars introduced in 2022